The 2002 Southern Miss Golden Eagles football team represented the University of Southern Mississippi in the 2002 NCAA Division I-A football season. The Golden Eagles were led by head coach Jeff Bower and played their home games at M. M. Roberts Stadium. They were a member of Conference USA.

Schedule

Roster

References

Southern Miss
Southern Miss Golden Eagles football seasons
Southern Miss Golden Eagles football